Coralli is a surname. Notable people with the surname include:

Claudio Coralli (born 1983), Italian footballer
Giulio Coralli (born 1641), Italian painter
Jean Coralli (1779–1854), French dancer and choreographer

See also
Corallo